Cambarus extraneus, the Chickamauga crayfish, is a species of crayfish in the family Cambaridae. It is found in North America.

References

Further reading

 
 
 

Cambaridae
Articles created by Qbugbot
Crustaceans described in 1870
Freshwater crustaceans of North America
Taxa named by Hermann August Hagen